Francisco Aguilar is an American lawyer and politician. A member of the Democratic Party, he has served as the Secretary of State of Nevada since 2023. He was elected in 2022, defeating Republican Jim Marchant.

Early life and education 
Born to a family of Mexican descent, Aguilar is named after his maternal grandfather Francisco, a miners' union leader in Arizona. Aguilar received his B.A., M.B.A., and J.D. degrees from the University of Arizona.

Career 
A lawyer, he worked as a law clerk for U.S. Senate Majority Leader Harry Reid. Aguilar served for eight years on the Nevada State Athletic Commission, including two years as chairman. He also served as special counsel to James E. Rogers, chancellor of the Nevada System of Higher Education. He also led Agassi Graf, a management company for tennis stars Andre Agassi and Steffi Graf.

Aguilar is a member of the Board of Directors for the Las Vegas Bowl, Sletten Construction Company, the Fulfillment Fund Las Vegas and the University of Arizona Foundation Board of Trustees. He is a founding board member of the Innocence Center of Nevada. He is the Chairman of the board of trustees of Cristo Rey St. Viator, a Catholic high school in North Las Vegas that principally serves students from impoverished families.

Aguilar works for De Castroverde Law Group as an attorney and owns Blueprint Sports, LLC, a sports technology company.

Nevada Secretary of State 
Nevada Secretary of State Barbara Cegavske could not seek reelection in 2022 due to term limits. Aguilar announced his candidacy to succeed her in the 2022 Nevada Secretary of State election. He unopposed in the Democratic Party's primary election. In the general election, he faced Republican nominee Jim Marchant, a notable election denier who believed the 2020 election had been stolen from former U.S. President Donald Trump.

Aguilar defeated Marchant in the November 8 general election. He is Nevada's first Latino secretary of state. Aguilar has indicated support for a legislative proposal to make harassing campaign workers a felony.

Electoral history

References

External links 

21st-century American politicians
American politicians of Mexican descent
Hispanic and Latino American lawyers
Hispanic and Latino American politicians
Living people
Nevada Democrats
Nevada lawyers
Nevada State Athletic Commissioners
Politicians from Tucson, Arizona
Secretaries of State of Nevada
University of Arizona alumni
Year of birth missing (living people)